The Kaikōura District is a territorial authority district in Canterbury Region on the South Island of New Zealand. The district encompasses the eponymous town of Kaikōura, a number of small towns and settlements and the surrounding rural area in northern Canterbury.

Geography
The Kaikōura District extends from the Pacific Ocean to the highest points of the Kaikoura ranges to the west, and along the coastline from Oaro in the south, to just beyond Kekerengu in the north.

Populated places 
Populated places within the district, aside from Kaikōura township, include:

 Main settlements:
 Kekerengu
 Clarence
 Rakautara
 Hapuku
 Ocean Ridge
 The Elms
 Peketa
 Goose Bay
 Omihi
 Oaro

 Minor localities:
 Ngaio Downs
 Parikawa
 Mangamaunu
 South Bay
 Mount Fyffe
 Swyncombe
 Mount Furneaux
 Lynton Downs

 Other communities:
 Waipapa Bay
 Okini Bay
 Half Moon Bay
 Puhi Puhi
 Inland Road

Governance
The Kaikōura District Council administers the district. The council consists of a mayor and seven councillors. Elections for positions on the council are held every three years in conjunction with nationwide local elections.

History

During the era of provincial government from 1853, the Kaikōura region was initially part of the Nelson Province, and was represented at the Nelson Provincial Council through the Amuri electorate. When the Marlborough Province split off from the Nelson Province, Kaikōura became part of that new province, with the Conway River as the new southern boundary. From 1860, the Kaikōura region was represented on the Marlborough Provincial Council first through the Flaxbourne and Clarence electorate, then the Clarence electorate, and finally the Awatere electorate. Provincial government was abolished at the end of 1876, and counties were formed instead.

From 1877, Kaikōura was governed by Kaikoura County. The county's boundary was adjusted northwards in 1940 to take over most of the East Coast Riding of Awatere County. There were also desires for land from Cheviot County to transfer to Kaikoura County, but the petition lapsed. In 1952, there were moves for a borough to be formed for Kaikōura township, but the underlying concerns which led to this initiative were addressed in different ways and no borough was formed. A 1971 scheme to form a Hurunui County would have seen Kaikoura County lose the area south of the Hundalee Hills, but this did not proceed.

The 1989 local government reforms disestablished all counties, and district and regional councils were formed instead. Kaikōura District was formed in the process, with the land south of the Hundalee Hills transferred to Hurunui District as per the 1971 proposal. At a regional level, Kaikōura belonged to the Nelson-Marlborough Regional Council. When the regional council was disestablished in 1992 after only three years, and its functions went to the unitary authorities of Nelson City Council, Tasman District Council, and Marlborough District Council, Kaikōura transferred to the Canterbury Regional Council. In 1993, an elector-initiated appeal wanted the northern 59% of Kaikōura District to be transferred to Marlborough District, but this was rejected by the Local Government Commission. There was a further elector-initiated proposal for Kaikoura District to merge with Hurunui District, but the Local Government Commission rejected this in 2009.

Anniversary day observance
In terms of its provincial anniversary holiday, Kaikōura observes the anniversary of Marlborough Province due to its historic association. This meant that the public holiday established through the Canterbury Earthquake Commemoration Day Act 2011 did not apply in Kaikōura District, as it only applied to the area where the Canterbury Anniversary Day is observed.

Demographics

Kaikōura District had a population of 3,912 at the 2018 New Zealand census, an increase of 360 people (10.1%) since the 2013 census, and an increase of 291 people (8.0%) since the 2006 census. There were 1,458 households. There were 1,998 males and 1,911 females, giving a sex ratio of 1.05 males per female. The median age was 46.3 years (compared with 37.4 years nationally), with 630 people (16.1%) aged under 15 years, 600 (15.3%) aged 15 to 29, 1,848 (47.2%) aged 30 to 64, and 831 (21.2%) aged 65 or older.

Ethnicities were 86.0% European/Pākehā, 18.4% Māori, 0.8% Pacific peoples, 4.1% Asian, and 2.6% other ethnicities. People may identify with more than one ethnicity.

The percentage of people born overseas was 15.7, compared with 27.1% nationally.

Although some people objected to giving their religion, 49.5% had no religion, 38.9% were Christian, 0.3% were Hindu, 0.5% were Muslim, 0.5% were Buddhist and 2.9% had other religions.

Of those at least 15 years old, 417 (12.7%) people had a bachelor or higher degree, and 738 (22.5%) people had no formal qualifications. The median income was $32,400, compared with $31,800 nationally. 402 people (12.2%) earned over $70,000 compared to 17.2% nationally. The employment status of those at least 15 was that 1,806 (55.0%) people were employed full-time, 564 (17.2%) were part-time, and 39 (1.2%) were unemployed.

Economy
In 2020, the GDP of the Kaikōura District was $232 million, with an annual growth for the region of 1.6%. Tourism contributed $57 million to total GDP in Kaikoura District in 2020, and was the top overall category, as shown in this table comparing district and national share of GDP:

Employment in the district was 2,007 (filled jobs) in 2020, with an annual growth rate of 1.4%. The top 5 industries (based on ANZSIC categories), by share of employment in the Kaikōura District in 2020, compared with the national share for that year were:

References

External links

Kaikōura District Council

Kaikōura District
Districts of New Zealand